The following radio stations broadcast on Longwave, AM frequency 252 kHz (1,190 meters):

Algeria
Radio Algeria Chaine 3 - Arabic language station, broadcast from Tipaza, Algeria. It broadcasts at 1.5 Megawatts during the day and at 750 kilowatts at night.

Ireland and UK
RTÉ Radio 1 - following the closure of Atlantic 252 (1989-2002) and its short lived successor TEAMtalk 252 (2002) RTÉ began broadcasting its Radio 1 service on this frequency from 2004 aimed at the Irish in Britain. RTÉ Conducted Digital Radio Mondiale (DRM) tests on this frequency in 2007. In 2014 RTÉ announced to would end its AM broadcasting. However, this has been deferred on a number of occasions. The proposed closure of this frequency has been put off until at least August 2020.

The station was still broadcasting on 252 kHz until June 2021, when it closed for 2 months for maintenance “to ensure it can keep broadcasting RTE on 252 kHz”

Former stations on 252kHz 
 Yle Radio 1 (Finland)
 Radio Tojikston (Tajikistan)
 Radio Rossii (Russia) - Closed down on 9 January 2014.

References

Lists of radio stations by frequency

fi:252 kHz